The University of Ngaoundéré (French: Université de Ngaoundéré) is a public university located in Ngaoundéré, Adamawa Region in Cameroon. It was established on 19 January 1993 by Presidential decree.

History
The university was created by the  Presidential Decree of 19 January 1993 transforming the Ngaoundere University Centre into a statutory State owned university.

Initially made up of two professional schools and four faculties, the institution today has four professional schools and faculties with an estimated 30,000 student population and welcomes students from all regions of Cameroon and neighbouring countries in the sub-region like Chad and the Central African Republic.

Organization
The Board of Directors is the supreme body of the university, which ensures the implementation of the development plan of the University as defined by the Council of Higher Education and Scientific and Technical Research and approved by the President of the Republic of Cameroon.
The University of Ngaoundéré is guided administratively and academically by a rector, appointed by presidential decree.

The rector chairs the university council, the competent authority in the academic and scientific field. He is assisted at the administrative level by the central government consisting of a secretary-general, three vice-presidents and four administrative units.

Faculties and schools

Faculties
 Faculty of Arts Letters and Human Sciences
 English Department
 Department of Anthropology and Sociology
 Department of Arts
 Department of French
 Department of Geography
 Department of History
 Department of Arabic Language and Civilization
 Department of Linguistics and African languages.
 Faculty of Science
 Department of Physics
 Department of Mathematics and Computer Science
 Department of Biological Sciences
 Department of Earth (Geological) Sciences 
 Department of Chemistry
 Department of Environmental Sciences
 Health Sciences and Biomedical Sciences
 Faculty of Economic Science and Management
 Department of Accountancy and Finance;
 Department of Management, Strategy and Forecasting;
 Department of Marketing ;
 Department of Monetary and Banking Economics.
 Faculty of Law and Political Sciences
 Department of Public Law ; 
 Department of Private Law ;
 Department of the Legal Theory and Epistemology
 Faculty of Medicine and Biomedical Sciences

Schools
 School of Geology and Mining Engineering
 National School of Agro-Industrial Sciences 
 School of Science and Veterinary Medicine 
 School of Chemical Engineering and Mineral Industries 
 University Institute of Technology

References

External links
University of Ngaoundéré

Ngaoundere
Educational institutions established in 1982
1982 establishments in Cameroon